Vasilyevskoye is a rural locality (a selo) and the administrative center of Krasavinskoye Rural Settlement, Velikoustyugsky District, Vologda Oblast, Russia. The population was 905 as of 2002. There are 10 streets.

Geography 
Vasilyevskoye is located 22 km northeast of Veliky Ustyug (the district's administrative centre) by road. Krasavino is the nearest rural locality.

References 

Rural localities in Velikoustyugsky District